Shokhsanamkhon Toshpulatova (born 4 May 1997) is an Uzbekistani Paralympic swimmer. She represented Uzbekistan at the 2016 Summer Paralympics held in Rio de Janeiro, Brazil and she won two bronze medals: in the women's 50 metre freestyle S13 and women's 200 metre individual medley SM13 events.

At the 2019 World Para Swimming Championships held in London, United Kingdom, she became the first Uzbekistani swimmer to win a gold medal at the World Para Swimming Championships. She won the gold medal in the women's 100 metre butterfly S13 event.

She also represented Uzbekistan at the 2020 Summer Paralympics held in Tokyo, Japan. She won the bronze medal in the women's 200 metre individual medley SM13 event.

References

External links 
 

Living people
1997 births
People from Andijan
Swimmers at the 2016 Summer Paralympics
Swimmers at the 2020 Summer Paralympics
Medalists at the 2016 Summer Paralympics
Medalists at the 2020 Summer Paralympics
Paralympic bronze medalists for Uzbekistan
Uzbekistani female backstroke swimmers
Uzbekistani female breaststroke swimmers
Uzbekistani female butterfly swimmers
Uzbekistani female freestyle swimmers
Uzbekistani female medley swimmers
Paralympic swimmers of Uzbekistan
Medalists at the World Para Swimming Championships
Paralympic medalists in swimming
S13-classified Paralympic swimmers
21st-century Uzbekistani women
Medalists at the 2018 Asian Para Games